was a Japanese football player. He played for Japan national team.

Club career
Shinosaki played for Keio University. He won 1937 Emperor's Cup. He also played for Keio BRB was consisted of his alma mater Keio University players and graduates. He won 1939 and 1940 Emperor's Cup at the club with Yukio Tsuda, Hirokazu Ninomiya and Takashi Kasahara. 1940 Emperor's Cup was the last Emperor's Cup before the war because Emperor's Cup was suspended for World War II from 1941 to 1945.

National team career
On June 16, 1940, when Shinosaki was a Keio University student, he debuted for Japan national team against Philippines and Japan won the match. This match was the first match since 1936 Summer Olympics and the only match in the 1940s in Japan's International A Match due to World War II.

National team statistics

References

External links
 
 Japan National Football Team Database

Year of birth missing
Year of death missing
Keio University alumni
Japanese footballers
Japan international footballers
Association football forwards